Kipumbwi  is an administrative ward in Pangani District of Tanga Region in Tanzania. According to the 2012 census, the ward has a total population of 5,333. Kipumbwi is named after a Medieval Swahili city state on the coast of Kipumbwi ward.

See also
 List of Swahili settlements of the East African coast

References

Swahili people
Swahili city-states
Swahili culture
National Historic Sites in Tanga Region
National Historic Sites in Tanzania
Archaeological sites in Tanzania
Wards of Pangani District
Wards of Tanga Region
Archaeological sites of Eastern Africa